Helen Marie Bennett (September 17, 1872  April 22, 1962) was an American journalist, businesswoman, and writer who organized the four women's world's fairs of the 1920s. She worked as a journalist for the Chicago Record-Herald and was the author of "Women and Work". She served as manager of the Chicago Collegiate Bureau of Occupations and is credited with envisioning the Woman's World's Fair with Ruth Hanna McCormick.

Helen Bennett was born on September 17, 1872 in Washington, Iowa. She was the daughter of Judge Granville Gaylord Bennett, an American lawyer who served as a justice of the Supreme Court for the Dakota Territory and as a delegate to the United States House of Representatives, and Mary Dawson. Her formative years were spent in Deadwood, SD. She had one sister, Estelline Rea Bennett (1868 - 1948), a journalist and author of OLD DEADWOOD DAYS, and two brothers, Robert Dawson Bennett (1878 - 1892) who was killed in a tragic hunting accident at age 14, and The Right Reverend Granville Gaylord Bennett D.D.(1882 – 1975) who was the second Bishop of Duluth and the eighth Bishop of Rhode Island in the Episcopal Church in the United States of America.

References

Bibliography

American women journalists
American women writers
American non-fiction writers
American business executives
Writers from Chicago
Journalists from Illinois
1872 births
1962 deaths